William Gwynn (1856 - 1 April 1897) was a Welsh international rugby union forward who played club rugby for Swansea and would later become secretary of the Welsh Rugby Union. Gwynn was an all-round sportsman and as well as his success on the rugby pitch he also player cricket for Swansea, of which he became vice-president, and Glamorgan. Gwynn had also played association football and had captained Battersea College XI through two undefeated seasons. He would later become a referee and would officiate the very first football game between Swansea Town and Cardiff City.

Rugby career 
Gould played most of his club rugby with Swansea, following his elder brother David into the team. He joined the club in 1880 and would captain the team in the 1884/85 and 1885/86 season. Gwynn was first selected to represent Wales in the opening game of the 1884 Home Nations Championship, against England. Under the captaincy of Charlie Newman, Wales lost to the English, but to a far close score line than the first two encounters. Gwynn was reselected for the next two Welsh international games, the first against Scotland, where he was partnered with Newman; and then Ireland with new half-back partner William Stadden. Gwynn should have scored in the Scotland game, but looked for support rather than touch the ball down when he had crossed the Scottish line. Gwynn played in two more games for Wales, both in the 1885 Home Nations Championship, a loss to England and a draw against Scotland.

International career
International matches played
 1884, 1885
 1884, 1885
 1884

Bibliography

References 

Welsh rugby union players
Rugby union players from Swansea
Swansea RFC players
Welsh football referees
Wales Rugby Union officials
Wales international rugby union players
1856 births
1897 deaths